Three Sisters Recreation Area is located in Bryn, Ashton-in-Makerfield, Greater Manchester, England. In 2011 it was designated a Local Nature Reserve.

The area was reclaimed from three coal mining spoil tips and an old golf course during the 1970s and now comprises a large area of woodlands and ponds. It has become a flagship example of brownfield regeneration in Greater Manchester. The site also contains a popular motorsport race circuit, used mainly by karts. During the 1980s and 1990s Three Sisters also had a popular BMX track, featuring the Wigan Whoops and King Kong obstacles.

References

External links
 Friends of Three Sisters
Facebook  Friends of Three Sisters

Parks and commons in the Metropolitan Borough of Wigan
Ashton-in-Makerfield
Local Nature Reserves in Greater Manchester
BMX tracks